The Canton of Bertincourt is a former canton situated in the department of the Pas-de-Calais and in the Nord-Pas-de-Calais region of northern France. It was disbanded following the French canton reorganisation which came into effect in March 2015. It consisted of 18 communes, which joined the canton of Bapaume in 2015. It had a total of 6,755 inhabitants (2012, without double counting).

Geography 
The canton is organised around Bertincourt in the arrondissement of Arras. The altitude varies from 67m (Havrincourt) to 137m (Rocquigny) for an average altitude of 118m.

The canton comprised 18 communes:

Barastre
Beaumetz-lès-Cambrai
Bertincourt
Beugny
Bus
Haplincourt
Havrincourt
Hermies
Lebucquière
Léchelle
Metz-en-Couture
Morchies
Neuville-Bourjonval
Rocquigny
Ruyaulcourt
Trescault
Vélu
Ytres

Population

See also
Cantons of Pas-de-Calais 
Communes of Pas-de-Calais 
Arrondissements of the Pas-de-Calais department

References

Bertincourt
2015 disestablishments in France
States and territories disestablished in 2015